Aleksandra (Alexandra) Putra (born 20 September 1986) is a Polish competitive swimmer.  As a member of the Polish women's team, she competed in the 4×200-metre freestyle relay at the 2012 Summer Olympics in London. She previously competed for France at the 2004 Summer Olympics in Athens. She swam for France at the 2008 European Short Course Championships, and won the 200m backstroke.

References

External links
 
 
 

1986 births
Living people
Olympic swimmers of Poland
Olympic swimmers of France
Swimmers at the 2004 Summer Olympics
Swimmers at the 2012 Summer Olympics
Sportspeople from Olsztyn
French female freestyle swimmers
French female backstroke swimmers
Polish female backstroke swimmers
Georgia Bulldogs women's swimmers
French people of Polish descent
Mediterranean Games gold medalists for France
Mediterranean Games bronze medalists for France
Mediterranean Games medalists in swimming
Swimmers at the 2005 Mediterranean Games